Zamelnichny is a rural locality (a khutor) in Novokhopyorsk, Novokhopyorsky District, Voronezh Oblast, Russia. The population was 328 as of 2010. There are 8 streets.

Geography 
Zamelnichny is located 4 km northeast of Novokhopyorsk (the district's administrative centre) by road. Novokhopyorsk is the nearest rural locality.

References 

Populated places in Novokhopyorsky District